Heavenly Bodies: Fashion and the Catholic Imagination was the 2018 high fashion art exhibition of the Anna Wintour Costume Center, a wing of the Metropolitan Museum of Art (MMA) which houses the collection of the Costume Institute.

The exhibition was held from May 10, 2018, to Oct 8, 2018. 1,659,647 people viewed the exhibit, making it the most visited exhibition in the museum's history. The theme for the Met Gala in 2018, May 7th, was Heavenly Bodies: Fashion and the Catholic Imagination and their goal was to highlight the influence of religion and liturgical vestments on fashion from designers such as Donatella Versace, and Cristobal Balenciaga. By placing fashion within “the broader context of religious artistic production” (like paintings and architecture), Costume Institute curator in charge Andrew Bolton, working alongside colleagues from the Met's medieval department and the Cloisters, aims to show how “material Christianity” has helped form “the Catholic imagination.” Heavenly Bodies was quoted to be a tribute to Andrew Bolton's exhibition, which displays fashion inspired by Catholicism and extraordinary treasures from the Vatican archives ( Bolton et. al, 2018).

Over 40 pieces from the Vatican were featured on display. 
 Many of these central pieces were on loan from the Sistine Chapel sacristy and have never been seen outside of the Vatican walls. The papal garb were not even included in the 1983 Met blockbuster, “The Vatican Collections: The Papacy and Art.” The Costume Institute curator in charge Andrew Bolton in collaboration with colleagues from the Met’s medieval department and the Cloisters, had the intent to display these pieces in a way to show how “material Christianity” has helped form “the Catholic imagination.”

Exhibition overview 
The exhibition features over 40 ecclesiastical masterworks, looks deriving from the Sistine Chapel sacristy ranging from the 18th to the early 20th century. Displays of these garments were showcased throughout multiple locations in the museum to "evoke the concept and practice of pilgrimage." Garments in the Mary and Michael Jaharis Galleries of Byzantine Art were inspired by the religious art and architecture of the Byzantine era. Fabric colors represent different forms of power; for example, the pope wears white, indicating the purity of the soul; cardinals wear red for their authority, and the bishops wear purple for their leadership and the protection they offer. Therefore, fashion, concerning catholic imagination, represents the culture of the power and rules of that societal influence on others. 

Priest David Tracy contributed an essay to the catalogue of the exhibition.

Exhibition designers
The wide range of designers who participated in the exhibition include: Designers in the exhibition include: A.F.Vandevorst, Azzedine Alaïa, Cristobal Balenciaga, Geoffrey Beene, Marc Bohan (for House of Dior), Thom Browne, Roberto Capucci, Jean-Charles de Castelbajac, Gabrielle Chanel, Sorelle Fontana, Domenico Dolce and Stefano Gabbana (for Dolce & Gabbana), John Galliano (for House of Dior and his own label), Jean Paul Gaultier, Robert Goossens (for Chanel and Yves Saint Laurent), Craig Green, Madame Grès (Alix Barton), Demna Gvasalia (for Balenciaga), Rosella Jardini (for Moschino), Stephen Jones, Christian Lacroix, Karl Lagerfeld (for House of Chanel), Jeanne Lanvin, Shaun Leane, Henri Matisse, Claire McCardell, Laura and Kate Mulleavy (for Rodarte), Thierry Mugler, Rick Owens, Carli Pearson (for Cimone), Maria Grazia Chiuri and Pierpaolo Piccioli (for Valentino), Pierpaolo Piccioli (for Valentino), Stefano Pilati (for Saint Laurent), Gareth Pugh, Yves Saint Laurent, Elsa Schiaparelli, Raf Simons (for his own label and House of Dior), Viktor Horsting and Rolf Snoeren (for Viktor & Rolf), Olivier Theyskens, Riccardo Tisci, Jun Takahashi (for Undercover), Thea Bregazzi and Justin Thornton (for Preen), Philip Treacy, Duke Fulco di Verdura (for Gabrielle Chanel), Donatella Versace (for Versace), Gianni Versace, and Valentina.

References

Metropolitan Museum of Art exhibitions
2019 in art
Fashion exhibitions
Catholic culture